Joshua M. Landis (born May 14, 1957) is an American academic who specializes in the Middle East and is an expert on Syria. He is the head of the Center for Middle East Studies at the University of Oklahoma, and since 2004, he has published the blog Syria Comment. He is married to Manar Kachour and has two sons, Kendall and Jonah Landis.

Background 
Landis was born on May 14, 1957 in Manhattan, New York City, New York. When he was one year old, his family moved to Saudi Arabia, where his father was sent by Citibank to open the first branch of an American bank in the country. After staying in Saudi Arabia for three years, Landis' family moved to Beirut, Lebanon, due to his father being transferred there to work as Citibank's Vice-President for the Middle East. When Landis was ten years old, his family moved back to the United States.

Landis earned a BA from Swarthmore College, majoring in European History and French Literature. He spent his college sophomore year in France. After graduating, Landis then returned to Beirut in the midst of the Lebanese Civil War to teach at the International College, Beirut. According to Landis, his experience of living in Beirut during the civil war shaped his interpretation of the Syrian Civil War later on. In 1981, Landis went to Damascus University on a Fulbright Grant. During the following year, whilst Landis was still living in Damascus, the Hama uprising of 1982 took place. Landis visited Hama a week after the uprising. Later he earned an MA from Harvard University, and his PhD from Princeton University. 

Fluent in Arabic and French, he has studied Turkish, Italian, and Ottoman Turkish.  He has received three Fulbright grants and a Social Science Research Council award.

Academia 
He taught at Sarah Lawrence College, Wake Forest University, and Princeton University before moving to the University of Oklahoma. Since May 2004, Landis has published the Syrian Comment blog, which focuses on Syrian politics, history, and religion. Landis regularly travels to Washington, D.C. to consult with government agencies.

Landis is a frequent analyst on TV and radio, such as PBS News Hour, Charlie Rose Show, CNN and Fox News. He comments frequently for NPR and BBC radio. He has spoken at the Brookings Institution, USIP, Middle East Institute, and Council on Foreign Relations.

References

External links 
Joshua M Landis at the University of Oklahoma
Syria Comment
Articles written by Joshua Landis:
""The Battle between ISIS and Syrias Rebel Militias,"" (January 4, 2014) in Syrian Comment
"“The Syrian Uprising of 2011: Why the Assad Regime is Likely to Survive to 2013,”" (February 2012) in Middle East Policy Vol. XIX, No. 1 (2012).
"Shishakli and the Druzes: Integration and Intransigence," in The Syrian Land: Processes of Integration and Fragmentation. Stuttgart: Franz Steiner Verlag, 1998: 369-396
Syria and the 1948 War in Palestine A shorter version of this article was published as “Syria in the 1948 Palestine War: Fighting King Abdullah’s Greater Syria Plan,” in Eugene Rogan and Avi Shlaim, eds., Rewriting the  Palestine War: 1948 and the History of the Arab-Israeli Conflict, Cambridge: Cambridge University Press, 2001, pp. 178–205. (Translated into French, Spanish and Arabic)
"Early U.S. Policy toward Palestinian Refugees: the Syria Option," in The Palestinian Regugees: Old Problems - New Solutions, eds. Joseph Ginat and Edward J. Perkins, University of Oklahoma Press: Norman OK, 2001, pp. 77–87.
Islamic Education In Syria: Undoing Secularism in Eleanor Doumato and Gregory Starrett, Eds., Teaching Islam: Textbooks and Religion in the Middle East, London & Boulder: Lynne Rienner Publishers, 2007, pp. 177–196.
"The Syrian Opposition,” The Washington Quarterly, Vol. 30, pp. 45–68. 2007. (written with Joe Pace)
"The Syrian Opposition: The struggle for unity and relevance, 2003–2008," in Fred Lawson, ed., Demystifying Syria, Saqi Books, 2009, pp. 120–143. (written with Joe Pace)
"Will failure to solve the Arab-Israeli conflict mean a new Cold War in the Middle East?" Foreign Policy - Middle East Channel, Tuesday, May 11, 2010
"The U.S.-Syria Relationship: A Few Questions," Middle East Policy, Vol. XVII, No. 3, Fall 2010, pp. 64–73.

Living people
1957 births
University of Oklahoma faculty
Middle Eastern studies in the United States
Swarthmore College alumni
Harvard University alumni
Princeton University alumni